Jean-Eugène Fromageau (30 March 1822 - 16 October 1897) was a French architect active in French Algeria. He served as the ecclesiastical architect of the Roman Catholic Archdiocese of Algiers from 1855 to 1870. He designed several church buildings, including Notre Dame d'Afrique.

Early life
Jean-Eugène Fromageau was born in 1822 in Saumur, France. He studied architecture at the École des Beaux-Arts.

Career
Fromageau served as the ecclesiastial architect of the Roman Catholic Archdiocese of Algiers from 1855 to 1870. He remodelled the Ketchaoua Mosque into the Cathedral of St. Philippe. He also designed Notre Dame d'Afrique in the Neo Byzantine architectural style. Additionally, he designed a seminary in Kouba and another one in Saint-Eugène, two suburbs of Algiers.

Upon his return to France, Fromageau designed the Roman Catholic church in Saint-Jouin-de-Milly. He was a member of the Architectural Society of Anjou.

Death
Fromageau died in 1897.

References

1822 births
1897 deaths
People from Saumur
École des Beaux-Arts alumni
19th-century French architects
French ecclesiastical architects
Architects of Roman Catholic churches